Argistes velox, is a species of spider of the genus Argistes. It is endemic to Sri Lanka.

See also
 List of Liocranidae species

References

Spiders described in 1897
Liocranidae
Endemic fauna of Sri Lanka
Spiders of Asia